Fritillaria kurdica is a Middle Eastern species of bulb-forming flowering plant in the lily family Liliaceae. It is native to Iran, Iraq, Turkey, and the Caucasus. The species is sometimes cultivated in other regions as an ornamental.

Fritillaria Kurdica (full name, "Fritillaria Kurdica. Bulletin of Kurdish Studies") is also the name of an academic periodical published in Poland, devoted to the study of the culture and history of the Kurdish people.

References

kurdica
Plants described in 1859
Flora of Kurdistan
Taxa named by Pierre Edmond Boissier
Taxa named by Friedrich Wilhelm Noë